Jodi Dean (born April 9, 1962) is an American political theorist and professor in the Political Science department at Hobart and William Smith Colleges in New York state. She held the Donald R. Harter ’39 Professorship of the Humanities and Social Sciences from 2013 to 2018. Dean has also held the position of Erasmus Professor of the Humanities in the Faculty of Philosophy at Erasmus University Rotterdam. She is the author and editor of thirteen books. Her most recent book is titled Comrade: An Essay on Political Belonging (Verso 2019).

Biography 
Dean received her B.A. in History from Princeton University in 1984. She received her MA, MPhil, and PhD from Columbia University in 1992. Before joining the Department of Political Science at Hobart and William Smith Colleges, she taught at the University of Texas at San Antonio. She has held visiting research appointments at the Institute for the Human Sciences in Vienna, McGill University in Montreal, and Cardiff University in Wales. She is an active member of the Party for Socialism and Liberation.

Work 
Emphasizing the use of Leninism, psychoanalysis, and certain postmodernist theories, Dean has made contributions to political theory, media studies and third-wave feminism, most notably with her theory of communicative capitalism—the online merging of democracy and capitalism into a single neoliberal formation that subverts the democratic impulses of the masses by valuing emotional expression over logical discourse. She has spoken and lectured in Austria, Belgium, Canada, Croatia, the Czech Republic, Denmark, Ecuador, England, Germany, Hungary, Ireland, Italy, the Netherlands, Norway, Peru, Turkey, the United States, and Wales. She was formerly co-editor of the political theory journal Theory & Event.

The Communist Horizon 
In the first few chapters of her 2012 book The Communist Horizon, Dean surveys the contemporary political landscape, noting the persistence of anti-communist rhetoric more than twenty-five years after the fall of the Berlin Wall. She says that capitalists, conservatives, liberals, and social democrats all agree that 20th-century Communist regimes were unqualified failures, thereby limiting the scope of discussion around political alternatives to liberal democracy and free markets, a fusion of which constitutes Dean's conception of neoliberalism. She asserts that when people think of capitalism they do not consider what she believes are its worst results (unemployment, economic inequality, hyperinflation, climate change, robber barons, the Great Depression, and the Great Recession) because the history of capitalism is viewed as dynamic and nuanced. By contrast, Dean writes that the history of communism is not considered dynamic or nuanced. Instead, there is a fixed historical narrative of communism that emphasizes authoritarianism, the gulag, starvation, and violence.

First, Dean holds that communism is widely viewed as interchangeable with the Soviet Union; communist experiments in Eastern Europe, Asia, Africa, or Latin American are often given little attention. Second, Dean asserts that the seventy-year history of the Soviet Union is condensed to the twenty-six years of Joseph Stalin's rule. Third, Dean thinks it is reductive to consider Stalin's violence, political suppression, and authoritarian rule—the purges, the great famines and the gulag—as the events that accurately represent communism because that ignores the modernization and industrialization of the Soviet economy, the successes of the Soviet space program, and the relative increase in the standard of living in the formerly agrarian economy. Fourth, Dean holds that the late Soviet years and the collapse of the Soviet Union in 1991 were the result of the political and economic rigidity of Stalin and his successors until Mikhail Gorbachev began glasnost and perestroika. On Dean's view, the history of Stalinism becomes the basis on which discussions around alternatives to capitalism are silenced. Lastly, Dean contends that Stalinism is seen as proof that communism cannot work in practice because any challenge to the political status quo will inevitably result in purges and violence.

Bibliography

Books 
 Solidarity of Strangers: Feminism after Identity Politics (University of California Press 1996)
 Feminism and the New Democracy: Resisting the Political (editor, Sage 1997)
 Aliens in America: Conspiracy Cultures from Outerspace to Cyberspace (Cornell University Press 1998)
 Political Theory and Cultural Studies (editor, Cornell University Press 2000)
 Publicity's Secret: How Technoculture Capitalizes on Democracy (Cornell University Press 2002)
 Empire's New Clothes: Reading Hardt and Negri (co-editor with Paul A. Passavant, Routledge 2004)
 Žižek's Politics (Routledge 2006)
 Reformatting Politics: Information Technology and Global Civil Society (co-editor with Geert Lovink and Jon Anderson, Routledge 2006)
 Democracy and Other Neoliberal Fantasies (Duke University Press 2009)
 Blog Theory (Cambridge: Polity Press, 2010) ISBN 9780745649702
 The Communist Horizon (London & New York: Verso Books, 2012) ISBN 9781786635525
 Crowds and Party (London & New York: Verso Books, 2016) ISBN 9781781687062
 Comrade – An Essay on Political Belonging (London & New York: Verso Books, 2019) ISBN 9781788735018
 Organize, Fight, Win: Black Communist Women’s Political Writing, edited by Jodi Dean and Charisse Burden-Stelly (London & New York: Verso Books, 2022) ISBN 9781839764974

Lectures 
 Jodi Dean (June 29, 2013). "The Limits of the Web in an Age of Communicative Capitalism". Public lecture in Dublin in June 2013.
 Jodi Dean (July 2, 2013). "Complexity as Capture: Neoliberalism and Communicative Capitalism". Public lecture at the University of York in July 2013.
 Jodi Dean (January 17, 2015). "Communicative capitalism and the challenge for the left". Rosa-Luxemburg-Stiftung. January 2015.
 Jodi Dean (June 10, 2015). "Jodi Dean – The Communist Horizon". Public lecture in Belgrade at the Institute for Philosophy and Social Theory and the Institut Français de Serbie in cooperation with the Center for Ethics, Law and Applied Philosophy (CELAP), Center for Advanced Studies in Southeastern Europe (CAS – SEE) and the Faculty of Media and Communications in Belgrade (FMK).

Articles 
 Jodi Dean (February 13, 2019). The Actuality of Revolution. The Hampton Institute.
 Jodi Dean, "Same As It Ever Was?" in New Left Review Sidecar (May 6, 2022)

References

External links 

 Faculty page  at Hobart and William Smith Colleges
 Jodi Dean at 
 Jodi Dean at 
 Jodi Dean at 

Living people
1962 births
American women political scientists
American political scientists
Hobart and William Smith Colleges faculty
Princeton University alumni
Columbia University alumni
American women academics
21st-century American women